Jasus frontalis, known as the Juan Fernández rock lobster, is a species of spiny lobster in the genus Jasus, found around the Juan Fernández and Desventuradas Islands in the south-eastern Pacific Ocean.

Description and life cycle
Jasus frontalis differs from the other two species in its species group – Jasus tristani and Jasus paulensis – by the lack of sculpturation on the first abdominal somite.

Distribution and fishery
The species was found to be plentiful and easily caught by early explorers who visited the area, such as Jacob Roggeveen (in 1722) and George Anson (in 1741). Today, J. frontalis is commercially fished throughout its range. The IUCN Red List states that while the catch has reportedly diminished and fishing efforts have increased, there is little quantifiable data on the catch per unit effort for estimating the conservation status and outlook for the species.

References

Achelata
Crustaceans of the eastern Pacific Ocean
Invertebrates of Chile
Edible crustaceans
Commercial crustaceans
Crustaceans described in 1837
Taxa named by Henri Milne-Edwards